Sandee Pyne, Ph.D. was recognized by the BBC in 2014 as one of 100 Women Change makers. She is a Change Management Coach and the Executive Director of Way Stones Coaching.

Life

Payne was raised in Thailand although she was born in Myammar. She was a stateless person. She has a Master's degree from Georgetown University and a Ph.D. in International Education Policy from the University of Maryland, College Park.

Payne is a certified brain-based and systemic team coach with clients in Asia, Australia, Europe and the United States. Prior to coaching, she worked in the international development sector in areas with a protracted conflict and intractable governance challenges. 
 
She was the CEO an international non-governmental organization in California with programs in Asia. 

In 2014 she was recognised for her work with women in Myanmawr when she was named as one of the BBC's 100 women.

References

Living people
American people of Burmese descent
Georgetown University alumni
University of Maryland, College Park alumni
Year of birth missing (living people)
BBC 100 Women